Jan Franse Verzijl (1599, Gouda – 1647, Gouda), was a Dutch Golden Age portrait painter.

Biography
Houbraken listed him with the Gouda painters Jan Damesz de Veth, Jan en Pieter Donker as noteworthy artists that he intended to include in his book of biographies. His source was Beschrijving der stad Gouda by Ignatius Walvis.

According to the RKD he was a follower of Caravaggio and is known for works in schuilkerkken. In 1644 he painted the regents of the orphanage of Gouda with a self-portrait of himself standing behind his brother-in-law Hart on the left. After his death his widow founded the Harten hofje in Gouda that was torn down in 1965.

References

Franse Jan Verzijl on artnet

1599 births
1647 deaths
Dutch Golden Age painters
Dutch male painters
People from Gouda, South Holland